The ninth season of the American television series Whose Line Is It Anyway? premiered on The CW on July 16, 2013, and concluded on September 24, 2013.

On March 1, 2013, it was announced that the series, previously canceled by ABC, would return to television on The CW, with Colin Mochrie, Ryan Stiles, and Wayne Brady all returning, with Aisha Tyler taking the role of the host, previously occupied by Drew Carey. In addition to the traditional rotating fourth improv player (often drawn from same pool of regulars that appeared on the original show), a new feature was that of a "special guest". This fifth player would not necessarily have an improv background, but would still participate in some of the improv games.

Cast

Recurring 
 Gary Anthony Williams (two episodes)
 Heather Anne Campbell (two episodes)
 Keegan-Michael Key (two episodes)
 Jonathan Mangum (two episodes)
 Jeff Davis (two episodes)
 Nyima Funk (two episodes)

Episodes 

"Winner(s)" of each episode as chosen by host Aisha Tyler are highlighted in italics. The winner(s) perform a sketch during the credit roll, just like in the original UK series.

References

External links
Whose Line Is It Anyway? (U.S.) (a Titles & Air Dates Guide)
Mark's guide to Whose Line is it Anyway? - Episode Guide

Whose Line Is It Anyway?
2013 American television seasons